James Franklin may refer to:
James Franklin (printer) (1697–1735), elder brother of Benjamin Franklin
James Franklin (naturalist) (1783–1834), British naturalist
Jim Franklin (artist) (born 1943), American poster artist
Jimmy Franklin (1948–2005), American aerobatic pilot
James Franklin (philosopher) (born 1953), Australian historian of ideas and philosopher
James Franklin (American football coach) (born 1972), American football coach at Penn State University
James Franklin (quarterback) (born 1991), American football quarterback
James Franklin (cricketer) (born 1980), New Zealand cricketer
James Franklin (meteorologist), American meteorologist
James M. Franklin (born 1942), Canadian geologist
Jim Franklin (director), British television director